Acheilognathus striatus is a species of freshwater cyprinid fish in the genus Acheilognathus.  It is endemic to China, where it is found in the Le’an River in Jiangxi Province.

References

Acheilognathus
Fish described in 2010
Freshwater fish of China